Robocar Poli is a South Korean animated children's television series created by ROI Visual. The series premiered on February 28, 2011 on Educational Broadcasting System, and 120 episodes have aired for five seasons (26 per season but season 5 has 16 episodes). Each of the episodes is normally 11 minutes long.

Series overview

Episodes

Season 1 (2011) 
Season 1 began on February 28 (with "Rescue Team of Brooms Town"), and ended on July 12, 2011 (with "Our New Friend, Whooper"). It contains 26 episodes.

Season 2 (2011–12) 
Season 2 began on December 26, 2011 (with "Rody is a liar"), and ended on May 15, 2012 (with "Harmony of Brooms Town (part 2)"). It contains 26 episodes.

Season 3 (2014) 
Season 3 began on February 26 (with "Brooms Town's Visitor"), and ended on May 22, 2014 (with "Amber's Training"). It contains 26 episodes.

Season 4 (2015) 
Season 4 began on August 31 (with "A Suspicious Friend"), and ended on November 24, 2015 (with "Our Fabulous New Friend"). It contains 26 episodes.

Season 5 (2022) 
Season 5 began on March 4 (with "TBA"), and ended on December 13, 2022 with ("TBA"). It contains 16 episodes.

References 

Robocar Poli
Robocar Poli